To exypno pouli ("the clever bird") is a 1961 Greek film.

Cast

Anna Fonsou as Fani
Kostas Hatzichristos as Loukas
Stavros Paravas as Mimis
Vasilis Avlonitis as Thanasis
Dimitris Nikolaidis as Mihos
Anna Mantzourani as Nitsa
Takis Christoforidis as Filotas
Stavros Paravas as Mimis Santopoulos
Maria Voulgari as Iro Dalezi
Katerina Gogou as Marina Mani
Rallis Angelidis as Apostolis
Babis Anthopoulos as Tryfonas
Marika Nezer as store customer

External links

1961 films
1960s Greek-language films
Films directed by Orestis Laskos
Greek comedy films
1961 comedy films